Dean Saunders is an American real estate broker and former politician.

Saunders moved to Lakeland, Florida, in 1983, and served in the Florida House of Representatives for two sessions from 1992 until 1996 serving Polk County.

Saunders was born to a citrus farmer and raised in Clermont, Florida. He received a bachelor's degree in citrus management from the University of Florida. During his senior year at UF, Saunders earned his real estate license. The same year Saunders stepped down as a state legislator, he founded the real estate firm SVN Saunders Ralston Dantzler. He has held several executive positions in the Realtors Land Institute, an organization affiliated with the National Association of Realtors. He has brokered large land deals for conservation agencies and organizations.

References

Members of the Florida House of Representatives
University of Florida alumni
Year of birth missing (living people)
Living people
American real estate brokers
People from Lakeland, Florida
20th-century American politicians
People from Clermont, Florida